Errit Lough is a freshwater lake in the west of Ireland. It is located in west County Roscommon in the catchment of the Boyle River.

Geography and natural history
The lake forms the Errit Lough Special Area of Conservation.

See also
List of loughs in Ireland

References

Errit